The Muskiki River is a tributary of the Nottaway River (via Lake Soscumica, in the administrative region of Nord-du-Québec, in the Canadian province of Quebec, at Canada.

Forestry is the main economic activity of the sector. Recreational tourism (especially hunting and fishing) comes second, thanks to the navigable water of Lake Soscumica, including the tributaries.

The west side of the lake is served by a winter road (North-South direction). The surface of the river is usually frozen from early November to mid-May, however, safe ice circulation is generally from mid-November to mid-April.

Geography 
The main neighboring hydrographic slopes are:
North side: Soscumica Lake, Nottaway River;
East side: Lake Ouescapis, Poncheville River, Lake Chensagi;
South side: Matagami Lake, Nottaway River, Waswanipi River;
West side: Soscumica Lake, Nottaway River.

From its source, the Muskiki River flows on  according to the following segments:
 northeasterly to the James Bay Highway (north-south direction);
 north along the James Bay road on the east side to the bridge where it cuts the road again;
 southwesterly, north, then west, to a stream (from the north);
 southwesterly to a creek (coming from the North);
 southwesterly to mouth.
The Muskiki River flows into a large bay on the Northeastern shore of Soscumica Lake. This confluence is located at:
 south-east of the mouth of Lake Soscumica;
 south-east of the mouth of the Nottaway River (confluence with Rupert Bay);
 North of downtown Matagami, Quebec;
 North of the mouth of the Matagami Lake.

Toponymy 
The toponym "Muskiki" was officialized on December 5, 1968, at the Commission de toponymie du Québec, i.e. at the creation of this commission

References

See also 
James Bay
Rupert Bay
Nottaway River
List of rivers of Quebec

Rivers of Nord-du-Québec